Shivani College of Engineering & Technology (SCET) (Formerly Shivani Institute of Technology) is an ISO 9001:2008 Certified  College of Engineering situated on the Trichy-Dindigul Highways in Tiruchirappalli district, Tamil Nadu, India. It was started in 2009 and it is affiliated to Anna University. It is also approved by AICTE, New Delhi. SCET is a college under Shivani Group of Institutions.

Vision & Mission 
"To be a world class institution that inspires young minds into talented professionals and best citizens."

Founder and Chairman 
Dr. P. Selvaraj is the founder chairman of Shivani Group of Institutions. He has been instrumental for the rapid growth of several institutions in and around Tamil Nadu. He is the secretary of the Consortium of Self-Financing Engineering colleges in Tamil Nadu and he plays a key role in the development of technical education in Tamil Nadu in the fields of science & Engineering. He is also a member of the Trichy District welfare committee headed by the District Collector, Trichy. He was awarded the Doctorate by the Florida University, USA for this 'Methods of preventing children from discontinuing their education in the primary level'.

Campus 
Shivani College of Engineering & Technology is situated in a serene 40 acre green campus on the Trichy-Dindigul Highways. The college is located 12 km from the city.

Courses Offered

Undergraduate Degrees:

 B.E Mechanical Engineering (Mech)
 B.E Civil Engineering (Civil)
 B.E Computer Science and Engineering (CSE)
 B.E Electronics and Communication Engineering (ECE)
 B.E Electrical & Electronics Engineering (EEE)

Postgraduate Degrees:

 M.E VLSI Design
 M.E Manufacturing Engineering
 M.E Power electronics and Drives

Sister Institutions 
 Shivani School of Business Management (SSBM), Trichy 
 Shivani Engineering College (SEC), Trichy
 AKKV Matriculation School, Annamalai Nagar, Trichy.
 SSK college of Engineering & Technology, Coimbatore.
 SSK Polytechnic College, Trichy.
 Sri Rengeswarar Polytechnic College, Pottireddypatti.
 Sri Rengeswarar College of Education, Pottireddypatti.
 Sri Rengeswarar Teacher Training Institute, Pottireddypatti.
 Sri Mariamman College of Education, Trichy.
 Sri Mariamman Teacher Training Institute, Trichy.
 Shivani Matriculation School, Thantengarpet, Trichy.
 Shiva College of Education, Thantengarpet, Trichy.
 Sivabackiam Industrial School, Thantengarpet, Trichy.

References

External links 
 Official Website

Private engineering colleges in Tamil Nadu
Colleges affiliated to Anna University
Education in Tiruchirappalli district
Educational institutions established in 2009
2009 establishments in Tamil Nadu